Fujiwara no Kimiko (藤原（西園寺）公子; 1232 – 6 March 1304) was Empress of Japan as the consort of Emperor Go-Fukakusa, her nephew.

In 1293 (first year of the Einin era) she ordained as a Buddhist nun.

Issue 

Second daughter: Imperial Princess Takako (貴子内親王)
Third daughter: Imperial Princess  Reishi (姈子内親王) (wife of Emperor Go-Uda)

Notes

Fujiwara clan
Japanese empresses
Japanese Buddhist nuns
13th-century Buddhist nuns
14th-century Buddhist nuns
1232 births
1304 deaths